Henrietta Maria de la Luz Gatica Boisier (January 15, 1922 – August 10, 1997), known as  Malú Gatica, was a Chilean actress and singer.

Biography
Gatica was born in Purén. With her parents, the journalist Roberto Gatica and Leonie Boisier, Gatica moved to New York in 1928 where she attended elementary and secondary school, as well as studying languages and music. Her first public appearance occurred as a singer at the age of 16 on NBC, where her father worked.

Later, in Buenos Aires, she studied theater at the Conservatoire Cunill Cabanellas. Her maternal grandfather was the French settler, French José Boisier Bourgeaux. In 1948 in the US, she married Eugene Fell, an American military attaché at the Mexican Embassy; they had a son, Leon. The marriage did not last long and she lost custody of her child. In 1995, she received the Orden al Mérito Gabriela Mistral, issued by the Ministry of Education of Chile in recognition of his outstanding and long career. She died in Santiago, where she returned in 1962.

Filmography

References

External links

1922 births
1997 deaths
Chilean film actresses
Chilean stage actresses
Chilean television actresses
20th-century Chilean women singers
Chilean people of French descent
20th-century Chilean actresses
Chilean expatriates in Argentina